The Shield (also known as The Shield: The Game) is a video game based on the television show of the same name. The Shield is a third-person shooter where players take on the role of Vic Mackey (portrayed by Michael Chiklis) fighting crime on the streets of Los Angeles.

Overview
The Shield plants itself firmly post-third season but pre-fourth season. The fallout from the money train robbery has already taken place and Detective Vic Mackey and his strike team of dirty cops are on the verge of disbanding. The game begins with the final episode of the third season. Officials want the team reassigned, members of the team are unhappy with the way things are going and Captain Aceveda tells them it's going to take a major bust to salvage any hope of keeping the team alive. The big bust in question turns out to be an arms race between the Byz-Lat and One-Niner gangs. Mackey is tasked with breaking up the battle, finding the guns, and arresting as many of the thugs in charge as possible.

Reception

The game was met with a negative reception upon release.  GameRankings and Metacritic gave it a score of 38.10% and 36 out of 100 for the PlayStation 2 version, and 38.40% and 34 out of 100 for the PC version.

References

External links

Interview at FiringSquad.com
Interview at Computer and Video Games

2007 video games
Aspyr games
Detective video games
Organized crime video games
PlayStation 2 games
Stealth video games
 
Third-person shooters
Video games about police officers
Video games based on television series
Video games developed in the United States
Video games set in Los Angeles
Windows games